Freek or Freeks may refer to:

Music
 Freek (album), a 1994 album by Keller Williams
 "Freek", a 2017 single by Tom Budin
 Freek FM, a pirate radio station that broadcasts UK garage
 Freek, a UAE-based Somali rapper

Other uses 
 Freek (given name), a male given name
 Freek, a character from Gamer
 Freeks, a 2017 novel by Amanda Hocking
 Freek, an energy drink from National Beverage
 FREEK, an energy drink label of Rip It
 Freek, a South African rugby player

See also

 Freak (disambiguation)
 Freeek!, a 2002 song by George Michael
 Freq (disambiguation)
 Phreaking
 Phreek